A list of Roman villas in Wales confirmed by archaeology.

References

See also
List of Roman villas in England

 
Villas, Wales
Roman villas
Villas in Wales